Kjartan Antonsson (born 30 September 1976) is an Icelandic businessman and former footballer who played as a midfielder.

Kjartan started his senior team career with Breiðablik before starring with ÍBV from 1998 to 2002. In 2004, he joined Breiðablik after spending the previous season with Fylkir.

He played in one match for the Iceland national team in 2001.

Personal life
Anton is the son of former Iceland national team member Anton Bjarnason.

References

External links

1976 births
Living people
Kjartan Antonsson
Association football midfielders
Kjartan Antonsson
Kjartan Antonsson
Kjartan Antonsson
Kjartan Antonsson
Kjartan Antonsson